Stephen Robert Staggs (born May 6, 1951) is a former Major League Baseball second baseman who played for two seasons. He played 72 games for the Toronto Blue Jays during the 1977 Toronto Blue Jays season and 47 games for the Oakland Athletics during the 1978 Oakland Athletics season.

Major League Career

Toronto Blue Jays (1977)
Staggs was drafted by the Kansas City Royals in the third round of the 1971 MLB Draft, and remained in their minor league system through the 1976 season.  On November 5, 1976, the Toronto Blue Jays selected Staggs in the 1976 MLB expansion draft.

Staggs made his Major League Baseball debut on July 1, 1977, going 2 for 5 in an 11-8 loss to the Texas Rangers.  Staggs first career hit was a home run off of Rangers pitcher Doyle Alexander.  Staggs finished the season appearing in 72 games with Toronto, batting .259 with 2 HR and 28 RBI.

On March 25, 1978, the Blue Jays traded Staggs to the Oakland Athletics for Sheldon Mallory.

Oakland Athletics (1978)
Staggs opened the first four games of the  1978 season as Oakland Athletics' starting second baseman, but thereafter was essentially a back-up infielder mostly used as a late inning defensive replacement, although with the occasional spot start.  In limited action, Staggs hit .244 with 0 HR and 0 RBI in 47 games with the Athletics.  He was sent down to the minors by the end of June.

Staggs would not play in MLB again.  He spent the 1979 season with the Denver Bears of the American Association before retiring.

Major League Career (1977-1978)
Staggs appeared in 119 career games, as he hit .255 with 2 HR and 28 RBI during his career.

External links

1951 births
Living people
American expatriate baseball players in Canada
Baseball players from Alaska
Billings Mustangs players
Cerritos Falcons baseball players
Denver Bears players
Iowa Oaks players
Jacksonville Suns players
Key West Conchs players
Major League Baseball second basemen
Oakland Athletics players
Oklahoma City 89ers players
Omaha Royals players
San Jose Bees players
Sportspeople from Anchorage, Alaska
Tiburones de La Guaira players
American expatriate baseball players in Venezuela
Toronto Blue Jays players
Waterloo Royals players